Sodium deuteroxide or deuterated sodium hydroxide is a chemical compound with the formula NaOD. It is a white solid very similar to sodium hydroxide, of which it is an isotopologue. It is used as a strong base and deuterium source in the production of other deuterated compounds. For example, reaction with chloral hydrate gives deuterated chloroform, and reaction with n-nitrosodimethylamine gives the deuterated analog of that compound.

References

Sodium compounds
Deuterated compounds
Hydroxides